Węgrów may refer to: 

Węgrów, a town in eastern Poland in the Masovian Voivodeship
WeGrow Store, a hydroponics franchise for medicinal marijuana

See also
 Węgrów (disambiguation)